Erin Cottrell (born August 24, 1975) is an American actress who has appeared in the role of Missie LaHaye in five of the eight films in the Love Comes Softly series. She was born in Yardley, Pennsylvania.

She acted in Love's Long Journey, Love's Abiding Joy, Love's Unending Legacy, Love's Unfolding Dream, and Love Takes Wing. She acted with Logan Bartholomew in Love's Long Journey and Love's Abiding Joy. In all of the films, she portrays the adult Missie Davis-LaHaye-Tyler except in the second film of the series.

Erin had a major role in an episode of Cold Case season five, episode 11, where she plays an art teacher in one of America's internment camps for people of Japanese ancestry during the Second World War. Her character plays a small part in the destruction of a Japanese family, as she is seen kissing a married man, but he tells her that his wife is the only one he loves, and he goes on to be killed. The episode is based on finding this man's real killer.

She has also had a role on NCIS Season 9, episode 11, playing a United States Marine lieutenant who is pregnant with the child of a deceased Afghan man (who is the leader of a prominent tribe). She delivers her baby with Leroy Jethro Gibbs at her side during a shootout with the men hired by her baby's father's family to kidnap the baby at a gas station in the middle of a Christmas Eve snowstorm.

She also voiced Delilah Copperspoon  for the video game Dishonored, specifically Dishonored: The Knife of Dunwall and Dishonored: The Brigmore Witches. She reprised her role  in the sequel Dishonored 2.

Filmography

References

External links

Erin Cottrell official website

1975 births
Living people
American film actresses
American stage actresses
American television actresses
American video game actresses
American voice actresses
Actresses from Pennsylvania
People from Yardley, Pennsylvania
20th-century American actresses
21st-century American actresses